Mrs. G. Goes to College (retitled The Gertrude Berg Show starting with episode 14) is a 26-episode American sitcom which aired on CBS from October 4, 1961, to April 5, 1962. The series starred Emmy Award-winning actress Gertrude Berg.

Synopsis
Having previously starred in the long-running radio and television series, The Goldbergs, Gertrude Berg returned to episodic television as Sarah Green, a 62-year-old widow who enters college. The character of Sarah Green (very similar to "Molly Goldberg") had been previously introduced to viewers as "Aunt Sarah" on Jackie Cooper's Hennesey sitcom on CBS earlier in 1961. English actor Cedric Hardwicke played Professor Crayton, and popular character actress Mary Wickes portrayed landlady Winona Maxfield.

Skip Ward was cast as fellow student Joe Caldwell, and Marion Ross appeared in five episodes as Berg's daughter, Susan Green. Aneta Corsaut (the future Helen Crump on The Andy Griffith Show) appeared  in 13 episodes as Irma Howell, a professor's wife. Karyn Kupcinet played Carol, a young fellow student of Sarah Green.

The plot centers on Sarah Green, a widow in her early sixties, who decides to acquire higher education, matriculates in her hometown college and interacts with, among others, her Cambridge University exchange professor (Cedric Hardwicke) and next-door neighbor George Howell (Paul Smith), a character analogous to Smith's Roy Norris from Fibber McGee and Molly, complete with a no-nonsense wife (Aneta Corsaut).

The series aired during the 9:30 Eastern slot on Wednesdays, under the sponsorship of General Foods, following CBS's Checkmate. Mrs. G. Goes to College aired during the second half of ABC's Hawaiian Eye and NBC's Perry Como's Kraft Music Hall.  Nielsen ratings were mediocre.  After thirteen episodes, a midseason move from Wednesday to Thursday night, along with a title change designed to emphasize Berg's name, The Gertrude Berg Show, did not improve the Nielsen ratings for the remaining thirteen episodes. CBS abruptly cancelled the series in April 1962 without showing any repeats.

Beginning on March 2017, the series was shown on get TV. From April 2018, the show was aired in the UK on Talking Pictures TV.

Production notes
Mrs. G. Goes to College was released by Dick Powell's Four Star Television. The series was produced by Hy Averback, the music was by Herschel Burke Gilbert.

Co-star Cedric Hardwicke, in a 1962 TV Guide article that focused on his work in the series, and references him as "Sir Cedric," is quoted as commenting, "If you're going to work in rubbish, you might as well get paid for it."

Episodes

Awards and nominations

References

External links 

 

1961 American television series debuts
1962 American television series endings
1960s American college television series
1960s American sitcoms
Black-and-white American television shows
CBS original programming
English-language television shows
Television series about Jews and Judaism
Television series by Four Star Television
Television shows set in New York (state)
Television series about widowhood